Hiremannapur  is a village in the southern state of Karnataka, India. It is located in the Kushtagi taluk of Koppal district in Karnataka.

Demographics
As of 2001 India census, Hiremannapur had a population of 5079 with 2619 males and 2460 females.

See also
 Koppal
 Districts of Karnataka,

References

External links
 http://Koppal.nic.in/

Villages in Koppal district